The Battling Kangaroo is a two reel, slap stick comedy film directed by Jules White in 1926. Fox Film Corporation produced and distributed the film. Fox Film released it in the US on December 5, 1926.

Sterling Holloway made his motion picture debut in this film.

Plot
Limber Lucy, a trapeze artist, wants to leave the carnival of which her family is part, put they cannot leave until her father repays $1,000 to the carnival owner, Knowkout Kelly. The latter is a former farmhand "who loved to plan cauliflowers on peopl's ears." Lucy flees Kelly after he accosts her.

Pete Brush, a taxi driver who fancies Lucy, learns of Kelly's pursuit of Lucy and that "a thousand dollars stand between [Lucy] and happiness." Brush sees and advertisement that "Knockout Kelly Fights Anything on Two Feet. $1000.00 CASH If You Knock Him Out." After failing to knock out Kelly himself, Brush and two carnival workers attempt to hijack a passenger from competitor's taxi, as the rider has offered "A thousand dollars if you reach the dock before my boat departs."

After commandeering the passenger, they deliver him to the boat but fail to procure the fare. Fleeing the other irate taxi driver, the three men accidentily free three kangaroos from a crate, who cause havoc. The three men are then able to guide one of the kangaroos, attired for boxing, into the ring with Knockout Kelly. The kangaroo, after battling with Kelly, then knocks him out. Brush receives the thousand dollars for the knock out. He and Lucy kiss.

Cast
The cast credits are from the film's intertitles.
Lige Conley as Pete Brush, the taxi driver who fancies Lucy
Sterling Holloway as Napoleon French, a carnival worker
, credited as George Grey, as another carnival worker
Mildred June as Limber Lucy
Al Kaufman as Knockout Kelly

Gallery

References

External links

1920s American films
1926 comedy films
1926 short films
American black-and-white films
American comedy short films
American silent short films
Films directed by Jules White
Fox Film films